La Loma may refer to:

La Loma, Coclé, Panama
La Loma (Jaén), a comarca in Andalusia, Spain
La Loma, Modesto, California
La Loma, New Mexico
La Loma, Quezon City, a district of Quezon City, The Philippines
La Loma, Santiago, Argentina
La Loma Bridge in Pasadena, California
La Loma Cemetery in Manila
La Loma Hills in southern California
La Loma Larga in Nuevo León, Mexico
La Loma Park in the San Francisco Bay Area
La Loma Plaza Historic District

See also
Battle of la Loma
La Loma tree frog
La Loma salamander